Li Zihe(?–664)The anti-king of the Sui dynasty. His original family name was Guo(郭), but he was later given the family name of the Tang imperial clan, Li(李), by Emperor Gaozu, the Tang dynasty's founding emperor. Ancestral home to the Tongzhou (同州)    Pucheng(蒲城).President Zuo Yiwei during the Sui Dynasty, because of the crime in exile in Yulin(榆林).In the Daye(大業) last years,An anti Sui,the self-proclaimed King of Yongle, the era name is Zhengping(正平), an ugly is Chouping(醜平).

In 618, he returned to the Tang dynasty, and he was awarded the main of the Lingzhou(靈州), the Duke of Jinhejun(金河郡),in 619,to seal the Public of Cheng(郕).In 622, the attendants were able to calm down Liu Heita,give the family name is Li and give the general of Youwuwei. In 637, he was a Cishi of Wuzhou(婺州),to the Public of Yi(夷).He died in 664.

Family

Father 
Guo Tai Gong(郭太公)

Brother 
Guo Zizheng(郭子政)
Guo Ziduan(郭子端)
Guo Zisheng(郭子昇)

Bibliography 
"New History of the Tang" (新唐書)/Volume 92

Notes 

664 deaths